Chrysopogon fulvus, called Guria grass, red false beard grass, and reddish-yellow beardgrass, is a species of grass (family Poaceae), subfamily Panicoideae. It is native to the Indian Subcontinent and Southeast Asia, and has been introduced to Florida. It is a palatable pasture grass, relished by oxen. It does well in semi-arid conditions.

References

fulvus
Flora of the Indian subcontinent
Flora of Indo-China
Flora of Peninsular Malaysia
Plants described in 1929